Mandana Dehghan (born 26 February 1991) is an Iranian racing cyclist.

Major results

2012
 3rd Road race, National Road Championships
2016
 2nd Time trial, National Road Championships
2017
 3rd Time trial, National Road Championships
2018
 Asian Games
6th Time trial
7th Road race
2019
 National Road Championships
2nd Road race
2nd Time trial
 10th Time trial, Asian Road Championships
2021
 National Road Championships
1st  Time trial
2nd Road race

See also
 List of 2018 UCI Women's Teams and riders

References

External links

1991 births
Living people
Iranian female cyclists
Place of birth missing (living people)
Cyclists at the 2018 Asian Games
Asian Games competitors for Iran
20th-century Iranian women
21st-century Iranian women
Islamic Solidarity Games competitors for Iran